Huber's Ferry Farmstead Historic District, also known as William L. Huber Farmstead , is a historic farm and national historic district located near Jefferson City in Osage County, Missouri.  It encompasses two contributing buildings and one contributing structure associated with a late-19th century farmstead.  They are the 2 1/2-story, five bay brick farmhouse (1881); a single story log structure, and a massive frame bank barn (1894). The house has a hipped roof and features a central two-story porch sheltering doors on each floor.

It was listed on the National Register of Historic Places in 1999.

References 

Historic districts on the National Register of Historic Places in Missouri
Farms on the National Register of Historic Places in Missouri
Houses completed in 1881
Buildings and structures in Osage County, Missouri
National Register of Historic Places in Osage County, Missouri